Barbus carpathicus (Carpathian barbel) is a species of cyprinid fish in the genus Barbus from eastern Europe.

References 

 

carpathicus
Cyprinid fish of Europe
Fish described in 2002